Philippe Michel-Kleisbauer is a French politician representing the Democratic Movement. He was elected to the French National Assembly on 18 June 2017, representing the department of Var.

References

Living people
Deputies of the 15th National Assembly of the French Fifth Republic
Democratic Movement (France) politicians
Year of birth missing (living people)